The Bald Rock Hotel is a heritage-listed pub in the suburb of Rozelle, overlooking White Bay in the inner west region of Sydney, in the state of New South Wales, Australia. It is the oldest continuously licensed hotel still operating in the Balmain and Rozelle area.

History
Bald Rock was originally a suburb within the municipality of Balmain, so named because of the lack of vegetation in the area. The hotel was built in 1876 and prior to landfill occupied a position close to the Bald Rock ferry, which carried passengers from Balmain to Erskine Street wharf in Sydney city.

The pub is listed on the Inner West Council local government heritage register. The three-storey building with facestone work to ground level has a simple hung awning over the street. The original construction was in the Victorian Filigree style, however removal of the upper level balcony and other modifications now leave a building in the Victorian Free Classical style. The hotel has retained the original sandstone interior.

See also

 List of public houses in Australia

References

External links

 Bald Rock Hotel website.

Pubs in Sydney
1876 establishments in Australia
Hotels established in 1876
Inner West
Rozelle, New South Wales